Earl J. Lennard High School is a public high school located in Ruskin, Florida. It opened in 2006, mainly for the purpose to relieve overcrowding at East Bay High School in  Gibsonton, Florida. It is named after former Hillsborough County Public Schools Superintendent, Dr. Earl J. Lennard.

Demographics
Lennard HS is 52.14% Hispanic, 24.63% White, 15.69% Black, 1.83% Asian, 0.39% Native American, and 5.32% multiracial.

Notable alumni
 Diontae Johnson, NFL wide receiver for the Pittsburgh Steelers

References 
Other: Earl J Lennard will soon change colors to Gold with a Purple accent due to controversy between it and the University of Texas.

Lennard
Public high schools in Florida
2006 establishments in Florida
Educational institutions established in 2006